Ali Abdulkarim al-Dandachi (1906 – February 8, 2000) was a Syrian who served as the vice president of the Boy Scouts de Syrie. Dandachi also served on the International Committee of the World Organization of the Scout Movement from 1951 to 1957. Dandachi had done a great deal to encourage Scouting throughout the Middle East, and during his term as a member of the International Committee, he visited practically every country in the region, leading to the establishment of an Arab Scout Bureau.

In 1969, Dandachi was awarded the Bronze Wolf, the only distinction of the World Organization of the Scout Movement, awarded by the World Scout Committee for exceptional services to world Scouting.

References

 Facts on World Scouting, Boy Scouts International Bureau, Ottawa, Canada, 1961
 World Organization of the Scout Movement (1990), Scouting 'Round the World. 1990 edition. 
 Marmarita.com
 Scouting Round the World, John S. Wilson, first edition, Blandford Press 1959.
 Ali al-Dandachi's profile at the Arab Encyclopedia

1906 births
2000 deaths
Recipients of the Bronze Wolf Award
Scouting and Guiding in Syria
Place of birth missing